The White Lilac is a 1935 British mystery film directed by Albert Parker and starring Basil Sydney, Judy Gunn, Claude Dampier and Percy Marmont. It is based upon the play of the same name by Ladislas Fodor. It was made at Wembley Studios as a quota quickie by the British subsidiary of Fox Film.

Plot
Several people are suspected of the murder of an unpopular villager.

Cast
 Basil Sydney as Ian Mackie
 Judy Gunn as Mollie
 Claude Dampier as Percy
 Percy Marmont as Tollitt
 Gwenllian Gill as Muriel
 Leslie Perrins as Iredale
 Constance Travers as Jessie
 Billy Holland as Harvey
 Marjorie Hume as Mrs Lyall

References

Bibliography
 Chibnall, Steve. Quota Quickies: The Birth of the British 'B' Film. British Film Institute, 2007.
 Low, Rachael. Filmmaking in 1930s Britain. George Allen & Unwin, 1985.
 Wood, Linda. British Films, 1927-1939. British Film Institute, 1986.

External links

1935 films
1935 mystery films
Films directed by Albert Parker
British remakes of French films
British films based on plays
British black-and-white films
British mystery films
1930s English-language films
1930s British films
Quota quickies
Films shot at Wembley Studios
Fox Film films